Wacha Koni is a settlement in Kenya's Tana River County.

Climate 
The climate is tropical humid.

Separatism 
Since 2012, an organization calling itself the Mombasa Republican Council has been active to secede the province from the rest of Kenya.

References 

Populated places in Tana River County